The Hong Kong–Zhuhai–Macau Bridge (HZMB) is a  bridge–tunnel system consisting of a series of three cable-stayed bridges, an undersea tunnel, and four artificial islands. It is both the longest sea crossing and the longest open-sea fixed link in the world. The HZMB spans the Lingding and Jiuzhou channels, connecting Hong Kong, Macau, and Zhuhai—three major cities on the Pearl River Delta in China.

The HZM Bridge was designed to last for 120 years and cost ¥127 billion (US$18.8 billion) to build. The cost of constructing the Main Bridge  was estimated at ¥51.1 billion (US$7.56 billion) funded by bank loans and shared among the governments of mainland China, Hong Kong and Macau.

Originally set to be opened to traffic in late 2016, the structure was completed on 6 February 2018 and journalists were subsequently taken for a ride over the bridge. On 24 October 2018, the HZMB was opened to the public after its inauguration a day earlier by Chinese leader Xi Jinping.

Planning

Background 
Hopewell Holdings founder and then-managing director Gordon Wu proposed the concept of a bridge-tunnel linking China, Hong Kong and Macau in the 1980s. Wu stated that he got the idea in 1983 from the Chesapeake Bay Bridge–Tunnel. In 1988, Wu pitched the concept to Guangdong and Beijing officials. He envisaged a link farther north than the current design, beginning at Black Point near Tuen Mun, Hong Kong and crossing the Pearl River estuary via Neilingding Island and Qi'ao Island. His proposed bridge would have ended at the Chinese village of Tangjia, and a new road would have continued south through Zhuhai before terminating at Macau. Discussions stalled after the Tiananmen Square protests in mid-1989 "unnerved" Wu and other foreign investors, and caused Hopewell's Hong Kong share prices to plunge.

The route proposed by Wu was promoted by the Zhuhai government under the name Lingdingyang Bridge. In the mid-1990s, Zhuhai built a bridge between the Zhuhai mainland and Qi'ao Island that was intended as the first phase of this route, though the full scheme had not been approved by either the Chinese or Hong Kong governments at the time. China's central government showed support for this project on 30 December 1997. The new Hong Kong government was reluctant, stating that it was still awaiting cross-border traffic study results, and Hong Kong media questioned the environmental impact of the project with regard to air pollution, traffic and marine life.

In December 2001, the Legislative Council of Hong Kong passed a motion urging the Administration to develop the logistics industry including the construction of a bridge connecting Hong Kong, Zhuhai and Macao. In September 2002, the China/Hong Kong Conference on Co-ordination of Major Infrastructure Projects agreed to a joint study on a transport link between Hong Kong and Pearl River West.

Preparation 
To coordinate the project, the Advance Work Coordination Group of HZMB was set up in 2003. Officials from three sides solved issues such as landing points and alignments of the bridge, operation of the Border Crossing Facilities, and project financing.

In August 2008, China's Central Government, the governments of Guangdong, Hong Kong and Macau agreed to finance 42 percent of the total costs. The remaining 58% consisted of loans (approximately ¥22 billion or US$3.23 billion) from the Bank of China.

In March 2009, it was further reported that China's Central Government, Hong Kong and Macau agreed to finance 22 percent of the total costs. The remaining 78 percent consisted of loans (approximately ¥57.3 billion or US$8.4 billion) from a consortium of banks led by Bank of China.

Construction 

Construction of the HZMB project began on 15 December 2009 on the Chinese side, with the Politburo Standing member and Vice Premier of China Li Keqiang holding a commencement ceremony. Construction of the Hong Kong section of the project began in December 2011 after a delay caused by a legal challenge regarding the environmental impact of the bridge.

The last bridge tower was erected on 2 June 2016, the last straighted-element of the  straight section of the undersea tunnel was installed on 12 July 2016, while the final tunnel joint was installed on 2 May 2017. Construction of the Main Bridge, consisting of a viaduct and an undersea tunnel, was completed on 6 July 2017, and the entire construction project was completed on 6 February 2018. During the construction 19 workers died.

Sections and elements 

The 55-km HZMB consists of three main sections: the Main Bridge in the middle of the Pearl River estuary, the Hong Kong Link Road in the east and the Zhuhai Link Road in the west of the estuary.

Main Bridge 
The Main Bridge, the largest part of the HZMB project, is a bridge-cum-tunnel system constructed by the mainland Chinese authorities. It connects an artificial island, housing the Boundary Crossing Facilities (BCF) for both mainland China and Macau in the west, to the Hong Kong Link Road in the east.

This section includes  and a 6.7-km immersed tube undersea tunnel that runs between two artificial islands, the Blue Dolphin Island on the west and the White Dolphin Island on the east. The viaduct crosses the Pearl River estuary with three cable-stayed bridges spanning between 280 and 460 metres (920 and 1,510 ft), allowing shipping traffic to pass underneath.

Hong Kong Link Road 
  
Under Hong Kong jurisdiction, the Hong Kong Link Road was built  to connect the main bridge-tunnel to an artificial island housing the Hong Kong Boundary Crossing Facilities (HKBCF).  This section includes a 9.4-km viaduct, a 1-km Scenic Hill Tunnel and a 1.6-km (1.0-mi) at-grade road along the east coast of the Chek Lap Kok.

Zhuhai Link Road 

The Zhuhai Link Road starts from an artificial island housing the Boundary Crossing Facilities for both mainland China and Macau, passes through the developed area of Gongbei via a tunnel towards Zhuhai, and connects to three major expressways, namely, the Jing-Zhu Expressway, Guang-Zhu West Expressway and Jiang-Zhu Expressway.

Left- and right-hand traffic 
Although the HZMB connects two left-hand traffic (LHT) areas, namely Hong Kong and Macau, the crossing itself is right-hand traffic (RHT), the same as in Zhuhai and other regions of Mainland China (the bridge is technically in Zhuhai for most of its length). Thus, drivers from Hong Kong and Macau need to make use of crossing viaducts to switch to RHT upon entering the bridge, and back to LHT upon leaving the bridge when they are back to Hong Kong and Macau. Traffic between Zhuhai and the bridge requires no left-right conversion as they are both RHT.

Transport

Shuttle buses 

The HZMBus shuttle bus service (colloquially referred as the "golden buses") runs 24 hours a day with bus departures as frequent as every five minutes. The journey across the HZMB takes about 40 minutes.

The HZMB Hong Kong Port can be reached from Hong Kong by taxi or various buses including Cityflyer airport routes A11, A21, A22 and A29, Long Win Bus airport routes A31, A33X, A36 and A41, the B4 shuttle bus from Hong Kong International Airport, the B5 shuttle bus from Sunny Bay MTR station, or the B6 bus from Tung Chung. In addition, all overnight airport buses (NA-prefixed routes) terminate and start service from the Hong Kong Port.

The HZMB Zhuhai Port can be reached from Zhuhai by taxis or the L1 bus which uses historic tourist vehicles, or Line-12, 23, 25 or 3 buses.

The HZMB Macau Port can be reached from Macau by taxis or various buses including the 101X bus and the 102X bus from St Paul's and Taipa, or the HZMB Integrated Resort Connection bus from Taipa Ferry Terminal or the Exterior Ferry terminal, connecting with free casino shuttle buses.

Private vehicles 
By the end of 2017 only 10,000 permits for private vehicles to drive across the HZMB from Hong Kong to Zhuhai had been issued. In addition, the number of vehicles permitted to enter Hong Kong and Macau from other regions is subject to a daily quota.

Since the Hong Kong government imposes significant fees, taxes and administrative paperwork on private vehicle ownership and usage to deal with road congestion, driving a car on the HZMB would incur the same restrictions as current cross-border traffic. These include applying for separate driving licences for both Hong Kong and mainland China, a Hong Kong Closed Road Permit for cross-boundary vehicles, and an Approval Notice from the Guangdong Public Security Bureau. Vehicle owners also need to ensure they have the appropriate insurance coverage for the regions they are travelling to.

In addition, to help compact Macau tackle its road congestion problems, drivers arriving from other regions are strongly encouraged to use a park and ride scheme, leaving their vehicles at a car park on the edge of Macau. A small quota of 300 vehicles are allowed to enter Macau directly.

Economic effects 
The HZMB links three major cities—Hong Kong, Zhuhai, and Macau—which are geographically close but separated by water. With the bridge in place, travelling time between Zhuhai and Hong Kong was cut down from about 4 hours to 30 minutes on the road.

The HZMB project is part of a Beijing-driven strategy to create an economic hub and promote the economic development of the whole area of the Pearl River Delta, which is also known as Greater Bay Area. Hoping to leverage the bridge and create an economic zone linking the three cities, Zhuhai's Hengqin area was designated as a free trade zone in 2015.

Controversies

White elephant project 
Some residents have complained that the bridge had been a waste of taxpayers’ money due to the restrictive criteria to be met and administrative paperwork needed in order to use the bridge with their own vehicle.

Delays and budget overruns 
The artificial island housing the Hong Kong Boundary Crossing Facilities (HKBCF) was reported drifting due to an unconventional method, hitherto unused in Hong Kong, for land reclamation using a row of circular steel cells pile-driven into the mud and filled with inert material to form a seawall.

The drifting of parts of the reclaimed island allegedly caused a delay in the HZMB project. The Highways Department denied various reports of movement up to  but admitted that parts of the reclaimed land had moved "up to six or seven metres", claiming that some movement was expected and safety had not been jeopardised.

Mainland contractors also reportedly had difficulty constructing immersed tubes for their section of the project, with the director of the Guangdong National Development and Reform Commission stating that 2020 would be a difficult target to meet.

By 2017, the Main Bridge of the HZMB project had experienced a cost overrun of about ¥10 billion, blamed on increased labour and material costs, as well as changes to the design and construction schemes.

Worker deaths and injuries 
The number of deaths and injuries during the construction project came under scrutiny in Hong Kong. In addition to 9 fatalities on the mainland side, more than ten deaths were reported on the Hong Kong side of the construction project, plus between 234 and 600 injuries, depending on the source. In April 2017, the Construction Site Workers General Union, the Labour Party and the Confederation of Trade Unions demonstrated at the Central Government Complex, demanding the government take action.

Lawmaker Fernando Cheung also expressed concern over the unknown death toll on the Chinese side of the project, stating: "the project is known as the 'bridge of blood and tears' and we are only talking about the Hong Kong side. We don't even know what is happening in China. I suppose the situation could be 10 times worse than that in Hong Kong." He said that the Hong Kong Government had a responsibility to consider worker safety on the Chinese side.

Faked safety testing 

In 2017, Hong Kong's Independent Commission Against Corruption (ICAC) arrested 21 employees (2 senior executives, 14 laboratory technicians, and 5 laboratory assistants) of Jacobs China Limited, a contractor of the Civil Engineering and Development Department for falsifying concrete test results, thus potentially risking the safety of the bridge for public use. In December 2017, a lab technician pleaded guilty and was sentenced to imprisonment for eight months, while the others await sentencing. Hong Kong's Highways Department conducted tests again after the falsified results were exposed and found all test results met safety standards.

Seawall integrity 
In April 2018, the public and media raised questions over the integrity of the seawalls protecting the artificial islands at both ends of the undersea tunnel. In footage taken by drone users and mariners, the dolosse installed at the edges of the artificial islands appear to have dislodged. Some civil engineers suggested that there was an error in design. In dismissing the safety concerns, the HZMB Authority said the dolosse were designed to be submerged and the design was working as intended. Director of Highways Department Daniel Chung denied on 8 April 2018 that the breakwater components had been washed away by waves.

Subsequent aerial footage posted online showed a section of the dolosse breakwater completely underwater. Civil engineer So Yiu-kwan told Hong Kong media on 12 April 2018 that the water level, at the time the photos were taken, was about 1.74 mPD (metres above Principal Datum), but the maximum water level could reach 2.7 mPD. He said the dolosse would offer no wave protection if entirely submerged, and further alleged that they had been installed backwards.

Impact on wildlife
Conservationists at WWF Hong Kong blamed the construction of the HZMB for the falling number of white dolphins in the waters near the bridge. The dolphins found near waters of Lantau were worst hit with numbers dropping by 60 percent between April 2015 and March 2016.

See also 

 
 
 
 
 
 
 
 
 
 List of buildings and structures in Hong Kong
 List of streets and roads in Hong Kong
 List of tunnels and bridges in Hong Kong
 
  − (short TM-CLK), tunnel from HZMB HK BCF to New Territories

References

External links 

 Official website (Chinese website)
 Official website (Hong Kong website)
 Official Project website (Hong Kong Project website)
 Highways Department page
 Official website (Macau website)
 Official website (shuttle bus operator)
 Save our Shoreline
 Designing HK, Tung Chung Sustainable Development
 
 Three cities, one bridge, graphics package by South China Morning Post with Landsat satellite images of the bridge

Bridges completed in 2018
Bridges in Hong Kong
Bridges in Macau
Bridges over the Pearl River (China)
Bridge–tunnels in Asia
Immersed tube tunnels in Asia
Pearl River Delta
Toll bridges in China
Toll bridges in Hong Kong
Toll tunnels in China
Transport in Guangdong
Transport infrastructure in China
Transport infrastructure in Hong Kong
Transport infrastructure in Macau
Tunnels in China
Webarchive template wayback links
World records
Borders of Hong Kong
Borders of Macau